The Barlow Apartments is a historic apartment house at 2115 Scott Street in Little Rock, Arkansas.  Built in 1921, it is an early example of a vernacular Craftsman style four-unit apartment block.  It is finished in a brick veneer, and has a broad gable roof with exposed rafter ends.  It was built for Virgil M. Barlow, and was scaled to fit in well with its single-family residential neighbors.

The building was listed on the National Register of Historic Places in 1995.

See also
National Register of Historic Places listings in Little Rock, Arkansas

References

Houses on the National Register of Historic Places in Arkansas
Residential buildings completed in 1921
Buildings and structures in Little Rock, Arkansas
National Register of Historic Places in Little Rock, Arkansas